Brendan Todd (born 5 August 1973) is an Australian windsurfer. He competed in the men's Mistral One Design event at the 1996 Summer Olympics.

References

External links
 
 
 

1973 births
Living people
Australian windsurfers
Australian male sailors (sport)
Olympic sailors of Australia
Sailors at the 1996 Summer Olympics – Mistral One Design
Place of birth missing (living people)
20th-century Australian people